Mārtiņš Ķigurs (born 31 March 1997) is a Latvian footballer who plays as a midfielder for Liepāja and the Latvia national team.

Career
Ķigurs made his international debut for Latvia on 9 September 2019 in a UEFA Euro 2020 qualifying match against North Macedonia, which finished as a 0–2 away loss.

Career statistics

International

References

External links
 , part 1
 , part 2
 
 

1997 births
Living people
Latvian footballers
Latvia under-21 international footballers
Latvia international footballers
Association football midfielders
FK Liepāja players
Latvian Higher League players